Milavići is a village in the municipality of Bileća, Republika Srpska, Bosnia and Herzegovina.

References

Villages in Republika Srpska
Populated places in Bileća